Kahnuj is a city in Kerman Province, Iran.

Kahnuj may also refer to:

Hormozgan Province
 Kahnuj, Ahmadi, Hormozgan Province
 Kahnuj, Fareghan, Hormozgan Province
 Kahnuj-e Bozorg, Hormozgan Province

Kerman Province
 Kahnuj
 Kahnuj, Baft, Kerman Province
 Kahnuj, Bam, Kerman Province
 Kahnuj, Jiroft, Kerman Province
 Kahnuj, Mahan, Kerman Province
 Kahnuj, Zangiabad, Kerman Province
 Kahnuj-e Moezabad, Kerman Province
 Kahnuj-e Shahrokhi, Kerman Province
 Kahnuj, Rabor, Kerman Province
 Kahnuj, Ravar, Kerman Province
 Kahnuj, Pa Qaleh, Shahr-e Babak County, Kerman Province
 Kahnuj, Hotkan, Zarand County, Kerman Province
 Kahnuj, Sarbanan, Zarand County, Kerman Province
 Kahnuj County, in Kerman Province

Yazd Province
 Kahnuj, Behabad, in Behabad County
 Kahnuj, Asfyj, in Behabad County